Mays Landing Presbyterian Church is a historic church at Main Street and Cape May Avenue in the Mays Landing section of Hamilton Township, Atlantic County, New Jersey, United States

It was built in 1841 and added to the National Register of Historic Places in 1982.

See also
 National Register of Historic Places listings in Atlantic County, New Jersey

References

Hamilton Township, Atlantic County, New Jersey
Churches on the National Register of Historic Places in New Jersey
Churches completed in 1841
19th-century Presbyterian church buildings in the United States
Churches in Atlantic County, New Jersey
Presbyterian churches in New Jersey
National Register of Historic Places in Atlantic County, New Jersey
New Jersey Register of Historic Places
1841 establishments in New Jersey